Yuriy Tokovy (born 10 March 1964) is a Ukrainian sailor. He competed in the Finn event at the 1996 Summer Olympics.

References

External links
 

1964 births
Living people
Ukrainian male sailors (sport)
Olympic sailors of Ukraine
Sailors at the 1996 Summer Olympics – Finn
Sportspeople from Kyiv